The Wolseley 60 hp or Type C was a British liquid-cooled V-8 aero engine that first ran in 1910, it was designed and built by Wolseley Motors. The engine featured water-cooled exhaust ports and employed a 20 lb (9 kg) flywheel. During an official four-hour test the engine produced an average of 55 horsepower (41 kW). A larger capacity variant known as the 80 hp or  Type B used an internal camshaft and propeller reduction gear.

Applications
60 hp
Royal Aircraft Factory B.E.1
Royal Aircraft Factory B.E.2
80 hp
Vickers E.F.B.1

Engines on display
A preserved Wolseley 60 hp is on public display at the Science Museum (London).

Specifications (60 hp)

See also

References

Notes

Bibliography

 Lumsden, Alec. British Piston Engines and their Aircraft. Marlborough, Wiltshire: Airlife Publishing, 2003. .

External links

Flight, March 1910 - Side view of the Wolseley 80 hp

60
1910s aircraft piston engines